Frank R. Strong was the eleventh Dean of the Ohio State University Moritz College of Law.

Education

Strong earned his bachelor's degree from Yale University in 1929.  He then received his J.D. degree from the Yale Law School in 1934.

Legal career

Strong entered academia as a professor of law at the University of Iowa College of Law from 1934 to 1937.  He then moved to the Ohio State University Moritz College of Law from 1937 to 1965, where he served as the eleventh Dean of the Moritz College of Law from 1952 to 1965.  The Moritz College of Law's annual Judges' Day is named the Frank R. Strong Forum in honor of Strong. In 1965, he moved to University of North Carolina School of Law, where he spent the rest of his career.

Scholarly work

Strong focused his scholarly work on constitutional law.

References

External links

Yale Law School alumni
University of Iowa College of Law faculty
Moritz College of Law faculty
Deans of law schools in the United States
2001 deaths
American legal scholars